This is a list of aircraft propeller manufacturers both past and present:

A
 Aero Ltd. - Poland
 AeroLux Propellers - United States
 Aeroproducts - United States
 Aerosila - Russia
 Airmaster Propellers - New Zealand
 The Airscrew Company - UK
 AKS Inc - United States
 Alisport, Italy (Idrovario Propellers)
 American Propeller Manufacturing Company - United States
 Arplast Helice - France
 Aymar-DeMuth Propellers - United States
 Aurusropellers - Aurus Design S.r.l.s. - Italy
 Avia Propeller - Czech Republic
 Aviation Design & Certification - Germany
 Avtek - Italy
 Axial - German Empire

B
 Banks Maxwell Propeller Company - United States
 Binder Motorenbau - Germany
 Baoding Propeller Plant - People's Republic of China
 Blackburn Aeroplane & Motor Co - UK
 Bolly Props - Australia
 Born Propeller - Germany
 British Maxim - UK
 Büttner Propeller - Germany

C
 Catto Propellers - United States (1975–present)
 Chauvière - France (1905-?)
 Collins Aerospace - United States (2018–present)
 Competition Aircraft - United States (1980–present)
 Culver Props - United States
 Curtiss-Wright Corporation - United States

D
 DCTA - Brazil
 de Havilland Propellers - United Kingdom (1935-1961)
 DM-Prop - Slovakia
 Dowty Rotol - United Kingdom
 Duc Hélices - France

E
 EVRA - France
 Electravia - Helices E-Props - France (2008–present)

F
 Fairey-Reed Propeller Company - UK
 Fahlin Manufacturing Company - United States
 The Falcon Airscrew Company - UK
 Falter (Shäfer) Propellerin - Germany
 Felix Propellers - United States
 Finish - Russia

G
 Garuda - German Empire
 GE Aviation Systems - UK
 GEFA-flug - Germany
 Geiger Engineering - Germany
 Gloster Aircraft - UK
 GSC Systems - Canada (1984–present)
 GT Propellers - Italy

H
 Haw Propeller - Germany
 Helices E-PROPS - Electravia - France (2008–present)
 Hélices Halter - France (1987-2014)
 Hamilton Standard - United States (1929-1999)
 Hamilton Sundstrand - United States (1999-2012)
 Hartzell Propeller - United States (1917–present)
 Hegy Propellers - United States
 Heine Propellers - Germany
 Helix-Carbon - Germany
 Hercules Propellers - UK
 F. Hills & Sons - UK
 Historic Propellers - Czech Republic (2012 - present)
 Hoffmann Propeller - Germany (1955–present)
 Hordern-Richmond - UK (1937-circa 1990)

I
 Idrovario Propellers, made by Alisport, Italy
 Ipswich Propellers - UK
 Ivoprop - USA
 IPT - Brazil (? - 1996)

J
 Jablo - UK
 Junkers - Germany (Third Reich)
 Junkers Profly - Germany

K
 Kasparaero - Czech Republic
 KievProp - Ukraine

L
 Lang Propellers - UK
 Lange Aviation - Germany
 LOM Praha - Czech Republic

M
 McCauley Propeller Systems - United States (1938–present)
 The Metal Airscrew Company - UK (-1927)
 Metal Propellers - UK
 MT-Propeller - Germany (1980–present)
 MW Propellers - United States

N
 Neuform Composites - Germany
 NeuraJet - Austria
 The Normal Propeller Company - UK

O
 W. D. Oddy & Company - UK

P
 P & K Enterprises - United States
 Pacesetter Propeller Works - United States
 PE Aero - Ukraine
 Performance Propellers - United States
 Precision Propellers - United States
 Peszke Aero Technologies -Poland
 Établissements Poncelet - Belgium
 Powerfin - United States
 Prince Aircraft - United States (1979–present)
 Props Inc - United States (1985–present)
 PropTec Hélices - Brazil (2006–present) - Aeronautical, Naval and Eolic Turbine Blades
 G. Proctor & Son - UK
 PZL Warszawa - Poland

Q
 Quinti Avio - Italy

R
 Ratier Figeac - France
 Reed Propeller Co. - United States
 Rospeller GmbH - Germany
 Rotol - United Kingdom (1943-1958)
 Rotol Airscrews - United Kingdom (1937-1943)
 Rupert Aeronaves - Brazil

S
 S&S Aircraft - Canada
 Schleicher - Germany
 Seabird Aviation Australia - Australia
 Sensenich Propeller Manufacturing Company - United States
 Sensenich Wood Propeller Company - United States
 Sportine Aviacija ir Ko - Lithuania
 Sport Prop - Czech Republic
 Sterba Propellers - United States
 Sterna Propellers - United States
 Sun Flightcraft - Austria
 Szomański

T
 Tarver Propellers - United States
 Tennessee Propellers - United States

U

 UTC Aerospace Systems - United States (2012–2018)

V
 Václav Stržínek - Czech Republic (2012 - present)
 Vari-Prop - United States
 Hélices Valax - France
 Vereinigte Deutsche Metallwerke (VDM) - Germany (Third Reich)
 Vpered Moscow Machine Building Plant - Russia
 VZLU - Czech Republic

W
 Bernie Warnke Propellers - United States
 Warp Drive Inc - United States
 Whirl Wind Propellers - United States
 Woodcomp - Czech Republic
 Wotan - German Empire

 
Pr
Aircraft propeller